In the 1985 Virginia gubernatorial election, incumbent Governor Chuck Robb, a Democrat, was unable to seek re-election due to term limits. Jerry Baliles, the Attorney General of Virginia, was nominated by the Democratic Party to run against the Republican nominee, Wyatt B. Durrette. This is the most recent time the Democratic candidate won a gubernatorial race in Virginia with a double-digit margin of victory.

Candidates
Jerry Baliles, Attorney General of Virginia (D), who defeated Lieutenant Governor Dick Davis.
Wyatt Durrette, former Virginia State Delegate, 1981 Republican nominee for Attorney General of Virginia (R)

Results

References

Gubernatorial
1985
Virginia
November 1985 events in the United States